England's Lane is the ninth studio album by the English singer-songwriter Peter Sarstedt. Released in 1997, it was produced by Brian Hodgson, a childhood friend of the singer. The album featured the sequel to his 1969 hit "Where Do You Go To (My Lovely)", titled "The Last of the Breed", continuing the story of the fictional Marie-Claire.

Production and personnel
Recorded at London's Bark Studios and released on the Angel Air label, the album features Peter Sarstedt, Brian Hodgson, Peter Lincoln, Gerry Conway, Peter May, Gerry Hogan, Mike Bell, Laurie Harper and Simon Mayer. The album also featured Sarstedt's brothers Richard a.k.a. Eden Kane and Clive on "Altogether Now" a track which had Albert Lee on guitar. The album title is a reference to England's Lane in Belsize Park, London NW3, an area that was home to all of the Sarstedt brothers at one time or another.

Track listing
 "England's Lane" (4:54)
 "British Museum" (4.30)
 "You Crazy Fool" (5:13)
 "The Horses" (4.08)
 "Biarritz" (2.38)
 "All Together Now" (2:39)
 "Castles in Spain" (4:11)
 "I Need Her" (4:31)
 "Spanish Made Easy" (3.06)
 "Empty Pages" (3:25)
 "The Last of the Breed" (5:13)

References

External links
 Peter Sarstedt official website

1997 albums
Peter Sarstedt albums